Numerous Indigenous Australians are notable for their contributions to Australian literature and journalism. Indigenous Australian literature includes fiction, plays, letters, essays and other works.

Literature
 Faith Bandler — activist and novelist
 Larissa Behrendt — activist, lawyer and novelist
 Lisa Bellear — dramatist and poet
 Charmaine Bennell — children's fiction
 Iris Burgoyne — autobiographer
 Burnum Burnum — writer and educator, tireless proponent of reconciliation
 Ken Canning — poet and activist
 Mary Carmel Charles — children's fiction
 Claire G. Coleman — writer and poet
 Jack Davis — poet and playwright
 Wesley Enoch — playwright, director
 Lionel Fogarty — poet and activist
 Richard Frankland — playwright, scriptwriter and musician
 Kevin Gilbert — activist, writer, artist
 Jane Harrison — playwright
 Ruth Hegarty — writer
 Anita Heiss — novelist, poet and children's author
 Kate Howarth — writer, memoirist
 Marnie Kennedy — autobiographer
 Ruby Langford Ginibi — writer, historian, autobiographer
 Melissa Lucashenko — novelist
 Ray Mancini — writer, educator
 Philip McLaren — author, academic and artist
 Olga Miller — historian, artist and author
 Sally Morgan — writer
 Mudrooroo (Colin Johnson) — poet, author, playwright (note: Johnson's Aboriginality is contested by many)
 Big Bill Neidjie – last surviving speaker of the Gaagudju language
 Oodgeroo Noonuccal (Kath Walker) — poet
 Bruce Pascoe
 Doris Pilkington Garimara
 Ronald Roe — writer
 Kim Scott — novelist
 Kirli Saunders — author and poet 
 Jared Thomas — writer, and arts curator
 Margaret Tucker — activist and author of If Everyone Cared (1977), one of the first autobiographies of the Stolen Generations
 David Unaipon (1872–1967) — first published Aboriginal author
 James Unaipon (1835–1907) — author and preacher
 Ellen van Neerven — novelist and poet
 Sam Watson — novelist and filmmaker
 Samuel Wagan Watson — poet
 Herb Wharton — poet and novelist
 Tara June Winch — novelist
 Alexis Wright — Miles Franklin Award winning novelist

Music and theatre 
Roger Bennett — playwright
Wayne Blair — television writer, actor and director
Jimmy Chi — composer, musician and playwright
Richard Frankland — playwright, filmmaker, singer, songwriter
David Page (musician) — composer, musician and playwright
Stephen Page — film director, choreographer

Journalism
 Dan Bourchier
 Miriam Corowa
 Jeremy Geia
 Freda Glynn
 Karla Grant — NITV anchor of Living Black
 Stan Grant
 John Newfong
 Rhianna Patrick
 Jack Patten

Non-fiction
 Frances Bodkin
 Veronica Gorrie

Essays and academia
 Chelsea Watego — academic and writer

External links

OzLit list of Australian Aboriginal and Torres Strait Islander writers

I
 
Writers
Indigenous
Indigenous Australian literature